Khaled Mohammed Khaled (born November 26, 1975), known professionally as DJ Khaled, is an American DJ, record executive, record producer and rapper.

Khaled first gained recognition as a radio host in the 1990s on the radio station 99 Jamz, and translated his popularity by working with hip hop collective Terror Squad as a DJ for their live performances. After gaining production credits on the group's material, Khaled released his debut album Listennn... the Album in 2006, which earned gold certification. He followed it with We the Best (2007), which contained the top 20 single "I'm So Hood". His subsequent two releases — We Global (2008) and Victory (2010) — were released after he founded the record label We the Best Music Group. Both albums charted in the top ten on the US Billboard 200, with the latter containing the single "All I Do Is Win", which was eventually certified triple platinum.

His fifth studio album We the Best Forever (2011) also saw similar commercial success, and helped bring Khaled to international prominence, as it featured the song "I'm on One", which was his first top ten hit. His sixth and seventh albums, Kiss the Ring (2012) and Suffering from Success (2013), charted in the top ten on the Billboard 200, and his eighth studio album, I Changed a Lot (2015), peaked at number 12. In 2015 and 2016, Khaled gained worldwide attention as a media personality, due to his activity on social media. This foresaw the release of his ninth studio album Major Key (2016), which gained critical and commercial success; it debuted at number one the Billboard 200, was certified gold, and received a Grammy nomination for Best Rap Album.

He released his tenth studio album, Grateful, in 2017, which contained the singles "I'm the One" and "Wild Thoughts", which charted at number one and number two on the Billboard Hot 100, respectively. The album debuted at number one on the Billboard 200, and was also certified platinum. His eleventh album, Father of Asahd, was released in 2019; it peaked at number two, and the song "Higher" won Best Rap/Sung Performance at the 62nd Annual Grammy Awards, Khaled's first Grammy award win. His eponymous twelfth album was released in 2021.

Outside of music, Khaled has gained success as a writer, with his book The Keys featuring on the New York Times Best Seller list. He has also featured as an actor, appearing in Spies in Disguise (2019) and Bad Boys for Life (2020).

Early life
Khaled was born on November 26, 1975, in New Orleans, Louisiana, to Palestinian parents who immigrated to the United States. His brother Alec Ledd (Alaa Khaled) is an actor.

His musician parents played Arabic music, and Khaled started developing an interest in rap and soul music at a young age, and his parents supported his interest. He worked in a local Merry-Go-Round record store which helped to lay foundations for his music career.

Career
During his early career, Khaled became acquainted with several young artists and helped them before their breakthrough; these include Birdman, Lil Wayne, and Mavado. One of his first jobs was at the New Orleans record store Odyssey where he met both Birdman and Lil Wayne in 1993. After leaving Odyssey, he began DJing in reggae soundclashes, mixing dancehall and hip-hop. His first radio gig was on a pirate station. In 1998, he moved to Miami and co-hosted The Luke Show on WEDR "99 Jamz" with 2 Live Crew's Luther Campbell. In 2003, he started hosting a weeknight radio show on 99 Jamz called The Takeover. During his career, Khaled has used many monikers including "Arab Attack", "Big Dog Pitbull", "Terror Squadian" (used during his time with the hip hop group Terror Squad), Beat Novacane (a moniker under which he produces beats), The Don Dada, Mr. Miami etc. Khaled has stated that he used the moniker "Arab Attack" for music as in saying "attack with music", but it was soon discontinued by him after the September 11 attacks since he felt that using it would seem disrespectful and offensive towards those who suffered due to the attacks.

2006–2008: Listennn... the Album, We the Best, and We Global 
On June 6, 2006, his debut album Listennn... the Album was released by Koch Records; it premiered on the US Billboard 200 chart at number 12. We the Best (2007) is his second album with singles "I'm So Hood" with T-Pain, Trick Daddy, Plies, and Rick Ross and "We Takin' Over" with Akon, T.I., Rick Ross, Fat Joe, Birdman, and Lil Wayne. "We Takin' Over" peaked at number 28 on the US Billboard Hot 100 and number 11 on the US Hot Rap Tracks chart and was certified Gold by the Recording Industry Association of America on November 20, 2007. Khaled made a guest appearance on Birdman's 2007 album 5 * Stunna on the single "100 Million"; which also features Rick Ross, Dre, Young Jeezy and Lil Wayne. That year, Khaled won two Ozone Awards: one for Best Video ("We Takin' Over") and another for Best Radio DJ.

In 2008, Khaled's third album We Global came out with singles "Out Here Grindin" with Akon, Rick Ross, Lil' Boosie, Trick Daddy, Ace Hood, and Plies, followed by "Go Hard" featuring Kanye West and T-Pain. RIAA certified the single "I'm So Hood" Platinum on June 4, 2008. That year, Khaled won DJ of the Year awards from the BET Hip Hop Awards and Ozone Awards. He was appointed the president of Def Jam South in February 2009. That same month, 50 Cent released a video titled “A Psychic Told Me”, in which he spoke of harming Khaled's mother and showed alleged footage of Khaled's mother’s workplace and his mother herself. Following this, Khaled refused to comment, not wanting to give 50 Cent the publicity, simply stating: "I'm not gonna let him bait me".

2010–2012: Victory, We the Best Forever, and Kiss the Ring

His fourth studio album Victory was released on March 2, 2010. The album featured guest appearances from Drake, Lil Wayne, Rick Ross, Nas, Snoop Dogg, Ludacris, Nelly, and more. The single "All I Do Is Win" featuring Ludacris, Rick Ross, Snoop Dogg, and T-Pain was certified as a double-platinum single. Other singles include: "Put Your Hands Up" featuring Ross, Young Jeezy, Plies, and Schife, and "Fed Up" featuring Usher, Drake, Ross, and Jeezy. The album had low sales and debuted at number 12 on the Billboard 200.

DJ Khaled announced the title of the album, We the Best Forever, on Twitter. On August 19, Khaled signed to Cash Money Records along to Universal Motown, the album will be released under the label, also under E1 Entertainment, Terror Squad, Def Jam South, and Khaled's own label We the Best Music Group, with confirmed guests as Fat Joe, Chris Brown, Keyshia Cole, Cee Lo Green, Cool & Dre, Rick Ross, Kanye West, Jay-Z, Nas, Birdman, Lil Wayne, T.I., Akon, Drake, and Nicki Minaj The first single titled "Welcome to My Hood", featuring Rick Ross, Plies, Lil Wayne and T-Pain was released on January 13, 2011, which was produced by The Renegades, and co-produced by DJ Khaled himself and The Nasty Beatmakers. The song is the first released under Cash Money Records and Universal Motown, a music video was filmed in Miami, Florida, and directed by Gil Green, featuring cameos by Flo Rida, Bow Wow, Busta Rhymes, and other artists. The next single, "I'm on One", featuring Drake, Rick Ross and Lil Wayne, was released on May 20, 2011. DJ Khaled performed the song at BET Awards 2011 which aired on June 26, 2011.

On December 10, 2011, DJ Khaled announced the title of his next album, Kiss the Ring, via a video, with the release date as "coming soon", presumed 2012. Guests on the album are T-Pain, French Montana, Future, Wiz Khalifa, Nas, Plies, Ace Hood, Kanye West, Rick Ross, Meek Mill, Big Sean, 2 Chainz, Jadakiss, Kirko Bangz, Mack Maine, Tyga, T.I., J. Cole, Kendrick Lamar, Big K.R.I.T., Mavado, Wale and many more. Khaled mentioned that he had a verse from someone very special which was later revealed as Scarface. The first single released was "Take It to the Head" featuring Chris Brown, Rick Ross, Nicki Minaj and Lil Wayne. The second single released was "I Wish You Would" featuring Kanye West and Rick Ross. Kiss the Ring was released on August 21, 2012. The third official single was "Bitches and Bottles" featuring T.I., Lil Wayne, and Future.

2013–2015: Suffering from Success and I Changed a Lot
In January 2013, DJ Khaled announced that he had started working on his seventh album, Suffering from Success. After going to a doctor due to a bald spot on his beard, the doctor told him he was "suffering from success" which inspired the album title.

The first single from the album, "No New Friends", features Drake, Lil Wayne and Rick Ross, along with production coming from Boi-1da and Noah "40" Shebib. On April 14, 2013, DJ Khaled released a promotional video for Suffering for Success and the first single "No New Friends". The single was premiered the following day and released to iTunes of April 19, 2013. "No New Friends" has since debuted at #55 on the Billboard Hot 100. On June 10, 2013, it was announced that Suffering from Success would be released on September 24, 2013. On July 25, 2013, Khaled publicly "proposed" to fellow Cash Money artist Nicki Minaj via MTV. He supported his offer with a 10-karat diamond ring from Rafaello & Co., valued at about $500,000. Later, he reaffirmed his proposal in an interview with Power 106's DJ Felli Fel, stating: "I ain't a young boy no more. I'm on my thinking the future. I just had to be honest. I always liked her. She's my friend, of course. And I like her. It's more than a crush." On July 29, 2013, in an interview with Funkmaster Flex, Minaj denied Khaled's proposal, saying: "Khaled is my brother and Khaled was not serious with that damn proposal, ya'll. Please let it go. He was kidding." The same day, Flex premiered Khaled's new single, "I Wanna Be with You", which featured Minaj, as well as frequent collaborators Future and Rick Ross. This lead some to believe that his proposal was a "publicity stunt" to promote his new single.

On April 28, 2014, DJ Khaled announced in an interview with MTV that Jay-Z would be featured on his new single. The interview was noted due to Khaled "cursing, gesturing, and tossing the microphone to the floor in an effort to convey the importance and impact of the music he has coming this summer." A few hours after that, he released the single called "They Don't Love You No More", also featuring frequent collaborators Rick Ross, Meek Mill and French Montana. The song will be on his eight studio album, I Changed A Lot, which was released in 2015. The following day, "They Don't Love You No More" was serviced to mainstream urban radio in the United States. On July 1, 2014, Khaled announced that he has partnered with Danish audio company Bang & Olufsen to launch his own brand of headphones, titled "We the Best Sound". The brand is advertised in the video "They Don't Love You No More." On August 8, 2014, Khaled released the official artwork for the second single from I Changed A Lot entitled "Hold You Down" which features Chris Brown, August Alsina, Future and Jeremih, and is produced by Bkorn, Lee on the Beats and LDB. The single was released on August 11, 2014, along with a music video, directed by Gil Green. On November 3, 2014, Khaled released the remix to "Hold You Down" featuring Usher, Rick Ross, Fabolous, and Ace Hood.

On May 11, 2015, DJ Khaled revealed that he had amicably parted ways with Cash Money Records. "I'm not signed to Cash Money at all. I've been off for a minute," Khaled revealed. "It's not that I'm here to promote that I've been off. That's family. But, nah, it's just We The Best. Nothing negative, everything's beautiful." On the same day, DJ Khaled released the third single off the album I Changed a Lot titled "How Many Times", featuring Chris Brown, Lil Wayne and Big Sean produced Bkorn, Lee on the Beats and OZ. DJ Khaled revealed that his long-delayed album, I Changed A Lot, released on October 23, 2015, and also revealed the album's artwork.

2016–2019: Major Key, Grateful and Father of Asahd
On February 5, 2016, DJ Khaled premiered the debut his new We The Best Radio show on Beats 1 with the premiere of Future's fourth studio album EVOL. On February 14, 2016, DJ Khaled announced that he would debut French Montana's new mixtape on We The Best Radio. The Wave Gods titled mixtape premiered on February 19, 2016. On February 29, 2016, Khaled signed a management-only deal with Jay Z's company, Roc Nation and announced his ninth studio album, Major Key, was going to be released in 2016, specifically on July 29, and has a lion on the cover. On June 3, 2016, Khaled released the first single off Major Key, "For Free", which was produced by the OVO team of Nineteen85 and Jordan Ullman. He also announced his album would feature Jay Z, Future, Kanye West, Big Sean, Lil Wayne, and Rick Ross. He later released a track called "I Got the Keys" with Jay Z and Future, that premiered after the 2016 BET Awards.

In late 2015 to early 2016, a number of Snapchat videos of Khaled's detailing his "key to success" received significant attention on the internet due to his larger-than-life persona. This newfound online recognition caused him to gain popularity; becoming an "internet phenomenon", with some now describing him as a "living meme" or "meme in human form". In October 2016, he appeared in advertising for the alcoholic beverage Cîroc Mango and starred in "Let's Get It: Khaled's Odyssey", an episode of Let's Get It.

On December 24, 2016, Khaled announced on Twitter that he was working on his tenth studio album. In January 2017, he was seen in the studio on his Snapchat with potential collaborators, such as Chance the Rapper, Justin Bieber, Migos and Mariah Carey. On February 9, DJ Khaled announced his tenth studio album would be titled Grateful and said that it was going to be released in June. On February 12, DJ Khaled released "Shining", the lead single of Grateful which features Beyoncé and Jay-Z.

He had a cameo appearance in promotional material for Spider-Man: Homecoming, and later appeared as a fictionalized version of himself in Pitch Perfect 3 (2017), in which his character is featured as both a performer and a major plot point. Also that year, he announced he would join Demi Lovato as the opening act for their Tell Me You Love Me Tour.

On March 1, 2018, Khaled announced his eleventh studio album would be titled Father of Asahd, titled after his older son Asahd. The album's lead single, "Top Off", featuring Beyoncé, Jay-Z and Future, was released the following day, on March 2. On July 23, Khaled announced the next single, titled "No Brainer", featuring Justin Bieber, Chance the Rapper and Quavo, which was released on July 27.

On March 5, 2019, Khaled announced that the album would be released in May 2019. It was released on May 17, 2019. He released several music videos for the album's singles on that day through May 20, including one for "Higher", featuring late rapper Nipsey Hussle and John Legend, a track which also garnered Khaled his first Grammy Award.

2020–present: Khaled Khaled and God Did
On July 17, 2020, Khaled released two singles simultaneously, titled "Popstar" and "Greece", both featuring Canadian rapper Drake. Two days prior, on July 15, Khaled announced his twelfth studio album would be titled Khaled Khaled, after his legal name. The announcement was accompanied with a video trailer documenting his life and career, including the birth of his sons Asahd and Aalam, who both will executive produce the album, and winning his first Grammy Award.

In March 2021, Khaled collaborated with Dolce&Gabbana on a collection of ready-to-wear and beachwear pieces.

On April 30, 2021, Khaled released his 12th studio album "Khaled Khaled" including 14-tracks song features R&B artist Jeremih, Cardi B etc.

On July 6, 2022, he announced the title of his upcoming 13th studio album God Did, and released the album on August 26, 2022.

Personal life 
Khaled and his wife Nicole Tuck have a son, Asahd Tuck Khaled, born on October 23, 2016. Khaled garnered national attention after streaming the birth live on his Snapchat account. On January 20, 2020, Tuck gave birth to their second son, Aalam Tuck Khaled.

In January 2017, Khaled purchased Robbie Williams's former house in Mulholland Estates, a gated community in Los Angeles, California. In 2018, Khaled purchased a waterfront home in Miami for $25.9 million.

Khaled has described himself as a devout Muslim.

Other ventures
Khaled provided a voice in the animated film Spies in Disguise, which was released on December 25, 2019. He also appeared in Bad Boys for Life.

In 2016, he wrote a book, The Keys, which includes his opinions on success, recounts life stories, and describes contributions from other musicians.

Inspired by his own home and lifestyle, he designed a new luxury furniture line "We the Best Home" and launched it in August 2018.

2018 SEC settlement
In November 2018, together with Floyd Mayweather Jr., Khaled agreed to a total settlement of $750,000 with the Securities and Exchange Commission (SEC) for failing to disclose payments accepted from issuers of an initial coin offering, specifying a personal $50,000 promotional payment from beleaguered cryptocurrency firm Centra Tech Inc., whose co-founders were indicted for fraud in May 2018. According to the SEC, "they are its first cases involving charges for violating rules on touting investments in so-called initial coin offerings, or ICOs." As part of the settlement, Khaled agreed to not enter any endorsement or promotional agreement with a securities participant for two years.

Discography

Studio albums
 Listennn... the Album (2006)
 We the Best (2007)
 We Global (2008)
 Victory (2010)
 We the Best Forever (2011)
 Kiss the Ring (2012)
 Suffering from Success (2013)
 I Changed a Lot (2015)
 Major Key (2016)
 Grateful (2017)
 Father of Asahd (2019)
 Khaled Khaled (2021)
 God Did (2022)

Filmography

Awards and nominations

References

External links

 
 
 
 

1975 births
Living people
Musicians from Miami
American hip hop DJs
American hip hop record producers
American Muslims
American people of Palestinian descent
Radio personalities from Miami
Cash Money Records artists
Musicians from New Orleans
Republic Records artists
American writers
Roc Nation artists
Southern hip hop musicians
Terror Squad (group) members
Shorty Award winners
Radio personalities from New Orleans